un-25 is a gene in Neurospora crassa, encode a fungus ortholog of the human 60S ribosomal protein L13, is the structural constituent of ribosome.

See also 
 Un-24

References 

Fungus genes